Operation Golden Phoenix is an annual preparedness exercise conducted in the southern California area which includes participation of civil, military and volunteer organizations. Established in 2006, the exercise has included drills for future earthquakes and terrorist attacks.

The exercises have focused on improving the coordination of local organizations through building personal relationships and improving communications.

References

Disaster preparedness in the United States